Mehr Avaran may refer to:
 Mehr Avaran, Isfahan